The Seventh Avenue station is a station on the BMT Brighton Line of the New York City Subway, located at the intersection of Seventh Avenue, Park Place and Flatbush Avenue in Park Slope and Prospect Heights, Brooklyn. The station is served by the Q train at all times and by the B train on weekdays only.



History 

Although on the BMT Brighton Line, Seventh Avenue was built almost fifty years after the main segment of the line from Prospect Park to Brighton Beach opened in 1878. Prior to its opening, trains on the line used what is now the Franklin Avenue Shuttle and a connection to the elevated BMT Fulton Street Line on their way to the line's terminus at Fulton Ferry in Brooklyn or Park Row in Manhattan.

The station is a product of the Dual Contracts, a 1913 group of contracts that provided for the construction of BMT (as well as IRT) underground lines in Manhattan and Queens. The first of these was the BMT Broadway Line which ran from its northern terminus at Times Square–42nd Street to its southern end at Whitehall Street in 1918. The Montague Street Tunnel, which linked Whitehall Street to Prospect Park station and would be the location for Seventh Avenue, opened on August 1, 1920, and moved trains from the elevated Franklin Avenue Line to the new underground line.

Station layout

The Seventh Avenue station has two tracks and two side platforms. Each platform has two closed staircases that lead to a closed portion of the mezzanine above the platforms. Just north of the station, next to the southbound track, an opening in the tunnel allows a view of the southbound local track of the IRT Eastern Parkway Line. At this point in the complex Flatbush Avenue tunnel, the IRT local tracks are to the outside of the Brighton line tracks, while the IRT express tracks run at a lower level, below the station, with emergency exits furnished from same on both platforms at this station.

Both platform walls have a golden mosaic trim line with blue and brown borders and white on blue "7" friezes appearing within them at regular intervals. Mosaic name tablets reading "7TH AVENUE" in white seriffed lettering on a blue background and gold and brown border appear below the trim lines. Gamboge I-beam columns run along both platforms, alternating ones having the standard black station name plate with white lettering.

This is one of two stations on the B train named "Seventh Avenue"; the other is Seventh Avenue–53rd Street on the IND Sixth Avenue Line in Manhattan.

Exits
This station has two entrances and exits. One stair goes up to the south sidewalk of Park Place east of Flatbush Avenue, while the other stair goes to the south sidewalk of Flatbush Avenue southeast of Park Place.

References

External links 

 
 Station Reporter — B Train
 Station Reporter — Q Train
 The Subway Nut — 7th Avenue Pictures
 Park Place & Carlton Avenue entrance north of Flatbush Avenue from Google Maps Street View
 Entrance near Seventh Avenue from Google Maps Street View
 Platform from Google Maps Street View

BMT Brighton Line stations
Park Slope
Prospect Heights, Brooklyn
New York City Subway stations in Brooklyn
Railway stations in the United States opened in 1920
1920 establishments in New York City